Sassenelva is a river flowing through Sassendalen in Sabine Land at Spitsbergen, Svalbard. The river feeds from the glacier Rabotbreen and side glaciers of Nordmannsfonna and Hellefonna, and debouches into Sassenfjorden.

References

Rivers of Spitsbergen